Reminiscence is the act of recollecting past experiences or events.

Reminiscence(s) may also refer to:

 Reminiscences (2010 film), a Peruvian film
 Reminiscence (2017 film), a Japanese film
 Reminiscence (2021 film), a science fiction drama film
 Reminiscence (album), by Bonnie Pink (2005)
 Reminiscence (EP), by Everglow (2020)